Donald Liebenberg is an American astronomer and adjunct professor in the department of physics and astronomy at Clemson University.

An avowed eclipse chaser, he best is known for having traveled around the world to see 27 total solar eclipses since 1954. He is also regarded as having spent more time in totality, the darkest area within the moon's umbra during a total solar eclipse, than anyone else alive.

Education 
Liebenberg attended the University of Wisconsin as a physics major in the early 1950s. He holds three degrees, including a PhD, from his alma mater.

Career and eclipses 
Liebenberg witnessed his first total solar eclipse on June 30, 1954, in Mellen, Wisconsin. Since then, he has traveled around the world to see solar eclipses, witnessing a total of 27 total solar eclipses. He observed his 27th, the solar eclipse of August 21, 2017, from his driveway; by coincidence, his house in Salem, South Carolina, was located in the path of totality.

His primary motivation for pursuing solar eclipses has been to study the sun's corona. To this end, he wrote a proposal and obtained a grant from the National Science Foundation in 1954. He later worked for the Los Alamos National Laboratory carrying out research into the temperature and energy input of the corona. In 1973, Liebenberg successfully petitioned French officials to commission an early Concorde supersonic aircraft for use in observing the solar eclipse of June 30, 1973. Flying on the Concorde, a group of scientists from Los Alamos and the Paris Observarory, including Liebenberg, remained in the path of totality for 74 minutes while conducting various scientific measurements of the corona. For comparison, the theoretical maximum duration for totality during the third millennium for any stationary point or observer on the Earth's surface is approximately seven and a half minutes.

He has worked as an adjunct professor in Clemson's department of physics and astronomy since 1996.

Personal life 
Liebenberg and his wife Norma reside in Salem, South Carolina.

References

External links
 Donald Liebenberg interview with CSPAN2
 Blog postings where Liebenberg further discusses his experiences witnessing and researching solar eclipses

Clemson University faculty
Los Alamos National Laboratory personnel
Year of birth missing (living people)
1930s births
Living people
People from Oconee County, South Carolina
University of Wisconsin–Madison College of Letters and Science alumni
American astronomers